Omphalocera munroei, the Asimina webworm moth,  is a moth of the family Pyralidae. It is found in the United States, including Florida, Indiana and West Virginia.

The larvae feed on the leaves, buds and twigs of Asimina species. The larvae create a leaf shelter from within they feed.

External links
Bug Guide
Images

Megarthridiini
Moths described in 1956